Rampal Singh (born 10 July 1937) is an Indian politician from the Gonda (Mehnaun constituency) in Uttar Pradesh. He is sometimes known by the alias 'Babu Ji'. He was a member of the state assembly for 3 times. First time from the Congress ticket and then from the Samajwadi Party.

Singh started his political life as a student leader in Lucknow University. After becoming a member of the Indian National Congress (INC), he served on many posts. He took active role in all the rallies and was considered to be very close to Rajesh Pilot, N.D. Tiwari and the Gandhi family. Singh along with three other Indian MLA's was selected for a seminar which was conducted in London. He is a lawyer and agriculturist by profession. He is married to Lt. Shrimati Vaidehi Devi.

References 

 
 http://psephos.adam-carr.net/countries/i/india/states/utta2.txt
 

Living people
1937 births
Indian National Congress politicians from Uttar Pradesh
Samajwadi Party politicians from Uttar Pradesh